Live at the Whisky: Snowball of Doom is the third live album by Racer X. It was recorded on May 25, 2001 at the Whisky a Go Go in West Hollywood, California at Racer X's first live concert since their hiatus. The concert was also recorded and released on DVD.

Track listing
"17th Moon"
"Into the Night"
"Let the Spirit Fly"
"Street Lethal"
"Dead Man's Shoes"
"Scarified"
"Getaway"
"Snakebite"
"Hammer Away"
"Evil Joe"
"Phallic Tractor"
"Fire of Rock"
"O.H.B."
"Godzilla" (Blue Öyster Cult Cover)

Personnel

Jeff Martin - vocals
Paul Gilbert - guitar
John Alderete - bass guitar
Scott Travis - drums

Additional credits
 Godzilla written by Blue Öyster Cult

External links
 Official Racer X website

Racer X (band) albums
2002 live albums
Shrapnel Records albums
Albums recorded at the Whisky a Go Go